The Sanjaya dynasty was an ancient Javanese dynasty that ruled the Mataram kingdom in Java during the first millennium CE. The dynasty was an active promoter of Hinduism in ancient Java.

Origin and formation
According to the Canggal inscription, the dynasty was founded in 732 by Sanjaya. The Canggal inscription was discovered in the village of Canggal, southwest of the town of Magelang. This inscription was written in the south Indian Tamil Pallava script and describes the erection of a linga (symbol of Shiva) on the hill in the Kunjarakunja area. The inscription continues that the area is located at a noble island called Yawadwipa (Java) which was blessed with an abundance of rice and gold. The inscription tells that Yawadwipa was ruled by King Sanna, whose long reign was marked with wisdom and virtue. After King Sanna died, the kingdom fell into disunity. Confusion was widespread due to this loss of a ruler and patron. During this, Sanjaya ascended to the throne. According to the inscription, he was the son of Sannaha, described as the sister of King Sanna. Sanjaya mastered holy scriptures, martial arts, and military prowess. He conquered neighboring areas, and his wise reign blessed his land with peace and prosperity for all his subjects.

According to Carita Parahyangan (a book from a later period which mainly tells the history of the Sunda Kingdom), Sanjaya was rather the son of King Sanna and Sannaha (Old Javanese: , armed, equipped; prepared, ready). This relationship of King Sanna and Sanjaya was not provided in the Canggal inscription. The Carita Parahyangan also mentions that King Sanna was defeated by his cousin, King Purbasora of Galuh, and had to retreat to Mount Merapi. Later, Sanjaya reclaimed Sanna's kingdom and ruled West Java, Central Java, East Java, and Bali. He was also involved in battle with Malayu and Kalingga (against their king Sang Srivijaya). 

Apart from minor differences, the main themes of Carita Parahyangan align with those of the Canggal inscription.

Relations with Shailendra
There are different theories regarding the Sañjaya–Shailendra relationship. Some scholars suggest that there was no distinct Sanjaya dynasty, and that instead only one dynasty, called Shailendra, ruled central Java. This theory was proposed by Poerbatjaraka: there was only one kingdom and one dynasty; the kingdom was called Mataram, with the capital in the Mataram area, and the ruling dynasty was the Sailendra. He held that Sanjaya and his offspring belonged to the Sailendra family, who initially were Shaivist.

Another theory suggests that the Sañjaya dynasty was forced to the north of Java by the Sailendra dynasty, which emerged around 778. The evidence for this event is based on the Kalasan inscription. During this period, the Sañjaya dynasty existed next to the Sailendra dynasty in Central Java, and much of the period was characterized by peaceful co-existence and cooperation.

The association of Sailendra with Mahayana Buddhism began after the conversion of Raja Sankhara (Rakai Panaraban or Panangkaran) to Buddhism. The later Sailendran kings, successors of Panangkaran, became Mahayana Buddhist too and gave Buddhism royal patronage in Java until the end of Samaratungga's reign. This theory is based on the Raja Sankhara Inscription (now missing), the Sojomerto inscription and the Carita Parahyangan manuscript. Shaivist Hindu gained royal patronage again in the reign of Pikatan, until the end of the Mataram kingdom.

Another evidence points that Sailendra family used the Old Malay language in some of their inscriptions, which suggests Sailendra dynasty's foreign origin in Sumatra and their connections with Srivijaya. This theory holds that the Sailendras, with their strong connections to Srivijaya, managed to gain control of Central Java and imposed overlordship on the rakais (local Javanese lords) including the Sañjaya, thus incorporating the kings of the Mataram Sañjaya dynasty into their bureaucracy. The center of the dynasty court seems to have been located in South Kedu (around Magelang, north of Yogyakarta).

Relations with Champa

Kingdoms of Java maintained a close relationship with the Champa kingdom in mainland Southeast Asia as early as the reign of the Sañjaya dynasty. Like the Javanese, the Cham are Indianized Austronesian people. An example of the relationship can be seen in the architectural features of Cham temples, which share many similarities with temples in central Java built during the reign of the Sañjaya dynasty.

Ruler of Central Java
Rakai Pikatan, who was the crown prince of the Sañjaya dynasty, wedded Pramodhawardhani (833–856), a daughter of Samaratungga, king of Sailendra. From that time onwards, the influence of Sañjaya, who was an adherent of Hinduism, began to emerge in Mataram, replacing the Buddhist Sailendra. Rakai Pikatan toppled King Balaputra, son of Samaratungga, also the brother of Pramodhawardhani. As a result, in 850, the Sañjaya dynasty became the sole ruler in Mataram. This ended the Sailendra presence in Central Java and Balaputra retreated to Srivijaya in Sumatra, where he became the ruler.

Information about the Sañjaya dynasty is also found in the Balitung inscription, dated 907. According to the Balitung inscription, when a ruler died, he transformed into a divine form. From this inscription, scholars estimated the possible sequence of the ruling kings of the Sañjaya dynasty:

 Sanjaya (732–760)
 Panangkaran (760–780)
 Panungalan (780–800)
 Samaragrawira(Rakai Warak) (800–819)
 Rakai Garung (819–838)
 Rakai Pikatan (838–850)
 Rakai Kayuwangi (850–898), also known as Lokapala
 Balitung (898–910)

It was also during the reign of the Sañjaya dynasty that classic Javanese literature blossomed. Translations and adaptations of classic Hindu literature into Old Javanese were produced, such as the Kakawin Ramayana. Around the 850s, Pikatan initiated construction of the Prambanan temple in Central Java, later completed and expanded extensively by King Balitung. The Prambanan temple complex is one of the largest Hindu temple complexes in Southeast Asia, and its greatness rivalled Borobudur, the biggest Buddhist temple in the world.

The succession of Sañjaya kings after Balitung was:

 Daksa (910–919)
 Tulodong (919–924)
 Wawa (924–929)
 Mpu Sindok (929–947)

Decline
In 929, Mpu Sindok moved the court of Mataram from Central Java to East Java. The reasons for the move are not entirely clear. Possible reasons include an eruption of the Merapi volcano, a power struggle, or political pressure from the Shailendra dynasty based in Srivijaya Empire.

The shift to East Java marked the end for the Central Javanese Sañjaya dynasty, and from then on a new dynasty named the Isyana dynasty emerged in East Java.

See also
 Candi of Indonesia
 List of monarchs of Java

References

External links
 About Prambanan Temple Indonesia

Precolonial states of Indonesia
Hindu dynasties
Central Java
Mataram Kingdom
8th century in Indonesia
9th century in Indonesia
Indonesian families